Allenwood G.F.C. is a Gaelic football club based in Allenwood, County Kildare, Republic of Ireland. Because it is located in County Kildare, the club competes in the County Kildare GAA board league and cup system. Allenwood was the winner of the Kildare Senior Football Championship in 2004 and Club of the Year in 1974. It was the home club of former Kildare Player of the Year Johnny Doyle.

Players
Johnny Byrne
Johnny Doyle
Timmy Dowling
Ken Doyle
David Earley
Mark Hogarty
David Hughes
Shane McCormack
Johnny Wiltshire

Honours
 Kildare Senior Football Championship: Winners (1) 2004
 Finalists 1971, 1999, 2006
 Senior League Champions Winners (4) 1964, 1993, 2002, 2004
 Kildare Intermediate Football Championship: Winners (2)1962, 1990
 Kildare Junior Football Championship: Winners 1961.

Bibliography
 Kildare GAA: A Centenary History, by Eoghan Corry, CLG Chill Dara, 1984,  hb  pb
 Kildare GAA yearbook, 1972, 1974, 1978, 1979, 1980 and 2000- in sequence especially the Millennium yearbook of 2000
 Soaring Sliothars: Centenary of Kildare Camogie 1904-2004 by Joan O'Flynn Kildare County Camogie Board.

External links
Allenwood GFC Club Website
Kildare GAA site
Kildare GAA club sites
Kildare on Hoganstand.com

Gaelic games clubs in County Kildare
Gaelic football clubs in County Kildare